Watters is a surname. Notable people with the surname include:

 Andrée Watters (born 1983), Canadian singer
 Charles J. Watters (19271967), chaplain in the United States Army
 David E. Watters (1944–2009), American linguist who specialized in Tibeto-Burman languages
 Frank Watters (fl. 1970s), British trade unionist and Communist who worked closely with historian and son-in-law Graham Stevenson
 Frank Watters (1934–2020), Australian artist and gallerist, owner of Watters Gallery in Sydney
 George Watters (19041980), British soldier
 George Watters II (born 1949), American sound editor (now retired)
 Harry Watters (fl. 1990s–2000s), American jazz trombonist
 Henry Watters (18531924), mayor of Ottawa, Ontario, Canada, in 1924
 Jesse Watters (born 1978), American interviewer and television host
 Loras Joseph Watters (19152009), American Roman Catholic bishop
 Lu Watters (19111989), American trumpeter and bandleader of the Yerba Buena Jazz Band
 Ricky Watters (born 1969), former NFL American football running back
 Sam Watters (born 1970), American songwriter and record producer, previously of the group Color Me Badd
 Thomas Watters (18401901), British Oriental scholar and translator 
 Warren Prall Watters (18901992), founding archbishop of the Free Church of Antioch in Nebraska

See also
Waters (surname)

English-language surnames
Patronymic surnames